Johann Andreas Wagner (21 March 1797 – 17 December 1861) was a German palaeontologist, zoologist and archaeologist who wrote several important works on palaeontology.

Career

Wagner was a professor at the University of Munich, and curator of the Zoologische Staatssammlung (State Zoology Collection).
He was the author of Die Geographische Verbreitung der Säugethiere Dargestellt (1844–46).

Wagner was a Christian creationist.

Pikermi
In his travels to the fossil beds of Pikermi, Wagner discovered and described fossil remains of mastodon, Dinotherium, Hipparion, two species of giraffe, antelope and others. His collaboration with Johannes Roth on these fossils became a major textbook in palaeontology, known as "Roth & Wagner", in which the "bones were much broken, and no complete skeleton was found with all the parts united".

Legacy

Wagner is commemorated in the scientific name of a species of South American snake, Diaphorolepis wagneri.

Bibliography
  1844-1846. Die Geographische Verbreitung der Säugethiere Dargestellt.
  Johann Andreas Wagner 1897. Monographie der gattung Pomatias Studer.

References

Some Biogeographers, Evolutionists and Ecologists:Chrono-Biographical Sketches

1797 births
1861 deaths
Paleozoologists
German paleontologists
Archaeologists from Bavaria
German curators
German science writers
German taxonomists
19th-century German zoologists
Christian creationists
Science teachers
Corresponding members of the Saint Petersburg Academy of Sciences
Academic staff of the Ludwig Maximilian University of Munich
German male non-fiction writers
19th-century German male writers
Writers from Nuremberg